The siege of Paris took place in 1590 during the French Wars of Religion when the French Royal Army under Henry of Navarre, and supported by the Huguenots, failed to capture the city of Paris from the Catholic League. Paris was finally  relieved from the siege by an international Catholic and Spanish army under the command of Alexander Farnese, Duke of Parma.

Background

After his victory over the Catholic forces commanded by Charles, Duke of Mayenne and Charles of Guise, Duke of Aumale at the Battle of Ivry on 14 March, Henry of Navarre advanced with his troops on his main objective of Paris, possession of which would allow him to confirm his contested claim to the French throne. Paris at the time was a large walled city of around 200,000–220,000 people.

Siege of Paris
On 7 May, Henry's army surrounded the city, imposing a blockade and burnt windmills to prevent food from reaching Paris. Henry had at this point only around 12,000–13,000 troops, facing defenders estimated at around 30,000, mostly militia. Owing to the limited amount of heavy siege artillery that Henry had brought, it was thought that the Catholic city could only be compelled to surrender through starvation. The city's defence was placed in the hands of the young Charles Emmanuel, Duke of Nemours.

Henry set up his artillery on the hills of Montmartre, and bombarded the city from there. In July his force was swelled by reinforcements to 25,000 and by August he had overrun all the suburbs outside the city walls. Henry tried to negotiate the surrender of Paris, but his terms were rejected and the siege continued.

On 30 August, news reached the city that a Spanish-Catholic relief army under general the Duke of Parma was on its way. The Duke of Parma's army was able to break the siege and send food supplies into the city. After a final attack on the city's ramparts failed, Henry broke off his siege and retreated. An estimated 40,000–50,000 of the population died during the siege, most of starvation.Some resorted to cannibalism after all animals had been consumed.

Aftermath 

After repeated failures to take the capital of Paris, Henry IV converted to Catholicism in 1593, reportedly declaring that "Paris is well worth a mass". The war-weary Parisians turned on the Catholic League's hardliners, who continued the conflict even after Henry had converted. Paris jubilantly welcomed the formerly Protestant Henry in 1594, and he was crowned King of France that year. Four years later he issued the Edict of Nantes in an attempt to end the religious strife that had torn the country apart.

See also
War of the Three Henrys
Religion in France
Edict of Nantes
Anglo-Spanish War (1585–1604)
List of French monarchs
List of wars and disasters by death toll

Notes

References
Horne, Alistair. Seven Ages of Paris: Portrait of a City. (2003) Pan Books.

1590 in France
Sieges involving France
Battles involving Spain
History of Catholicism in France
Battles of the French Wars of Religion
Battles in Île-de-France
Conflicts in 1590
Sieges involving Spain
Sieges involving England
Siege 1590
Siege
16th-century military history of France
Cannibalism in Europe
Incidents of cannibalism